Stephen Copp (born 23 June 1976) is a Swedish snowboarder. He competed at the 1998 Winter Olympics and the 2002 Winter Olympics.

References

External links
 

1976 births
Living people
Swedish male snowboarders
Olympic snowboarders of Sweden
Snowboarders at the 1998 Winter Olympics
Snowboarders at the 2002 Winter Olympics
People from Skellefteå Municipality
Sportspeople from Västerbotten County